is a railway station on the Okinawa Urban Monorail (Yui Rail) in Naha, Okinawa, Japan. It is the westernmost station in Japan, and the southernmost airport station in the country.

The station has two platforms, though platform 2 is for the most part only used during rush hour. The station is connected directly to the second floor of Naha Airport via an elevated pedestrian bridge with a moving walkway.

The station opened on 10 August 2003. A plaque officially marking it as the westernmost station in the country was unveiled on 12 July the following year. The traditional Okinawan folksong  is used as the chime to announce the arrival and departure of trains.

Line
Okinawa Urban Monorail

Adjacent stations

See also

 List of railway stations in Japan

References

External links

  

Railway stations in Japan opened in 2003
Railway stations in Okinawa Prefecture
Naha
Airport railway stations in Japan